Aaviku may refer to several places in Estonia:

Aaviku, Harju County, village in Rae Parish, Harju County
Aaviku, Lääne-Viru County, village in Haljala Parish, Lääne-Viru County
Aaviku, Saare County, village in Laimjala Parish, Saare County